Sardar Hussain Babak is a Pakistani politician from the village Totalai, Buner District who had been a member of the Khyber Pakhtunkhwa Assembly belonging to the Awami National Party (ANP) from August 2018 till January 2023. He also served as a member of the different committees.

Early life and education
Babak completed high school from his village Totalai, intermediate from Government Superior Science College Peshawar, BSc degree from Islamia College University and his master's degree in Journalism from the University of Peshawar.

Political career
Sardar Hussain Babak started his political career back in 2002, as a candidate of the Awami National Party (ANP) from constituency PK-77 (now PK-22). He was elected as member of the Assembly from the same constituency in 2008, 2013 and 2018. He is currently serving as Parliamentary leader of the Awami National Party in Khyber Pakhtunkhwa Assembly. 
He is also a Chairman of the Standing Committee on Inter Provincial Coordination Department  and member of the Standing Committee on Sports, Tourism, Archaeology, Youth Affairs & Museums Department, Standing Committee on Elementary and Secondary Education Department   and Standing Committee on Planning and Development Department  of the Khyber Pakhtunkhwa Assembly.
He was also a member of the Standing Committee on Elementary and Secondary Education committee of Khyber Pakhtunkhwa Assembly in 2013.

He also served as Education Minister and member of the Khyber Pakhtunkhwa Assembly from 2008 to 2013.

He is also serving as General Secretary Awami National Party (ANP) Khyber Pakhtunkhwa.

References

Living people
Pashtun people
Khyber Pakhtunkhwa MPAs 2013–2018
Awami National Party MPAs (Khyber Pakhtunkhwa)
University of Peshawar alumni
Islamia College University alumni
People from Buner District
Year of birth missing (living people)